Jagannath Mahto is a politician and cabinet minister from Jharkhand, India. He represents the Dumri Vidhan Sabha constituency as a Jharkhand Mukti Morcha MLA.

References

Members of the Jharkhand Legislative Assembly
Jharkhand Mukti Morcha politicians
Year of birth missing (living people)
Place of birth missing (living people)
Living people